Donald Charles Furness (11 April 1921 – c. 1993) was a rugby union player who represented Australia.

Furness, a hooker, was born in Clovelly, New South Wales and claimed 1 international rugby cap for Australia.

References

Australian rugby union players
Australia international rugby union players
1921 births
1993 deaths
Rugby union players from Sydney
Rugby union hookers